Guillaume-Marie-Joseph Labouré (27 October 1841 – 21 April 1906) was a French archbishop and cardinal.

Biography
Born in Achiet-le-Petit, he studied at Saint-Sulpice Seminary in Paris and was ordained to the priesthood on 23 September 1865. In the Diocese of Arras, he served as a professor and superior of its minor seminary and also vicar general.

On 27 March 1885 he was appointed Bishop of Le Mans by Pope Leo XIII. He received his episcopal consecration on the following 31 May from Archbishop Guillaume Meignan, with Bishops Clovis Catteau and Désire Donnel serving as co-consecrators. He was promoted to the Archdiocese of Rennes on 15 June 1893 and named an Assistant at the Pontifical Throne on 26 June 1896.

Leo XIII created him Cardinal Priest of S. Maria Nuova e S. Francesca in Foro Romano in the consistory of 19 April 1897. He participated in the papal conclave of 1903, which elected Pope Pius X.

He died in Rennes and was buried in the cathedral there.

References

External links
Catholic-Hierarchy 
Cardinals of the Holy Roman Church

1841 births
1906 deaths
19th-century French cardinals
Cardinals created by Pope Leo XIII
Bishops of Le Mans
Archbishops of Rennes
20th-century French cardinals
People from Pas-de-Calais